Aspergillus elegans is a species of fungus in the genus Aspergillus. It is from the Circumdati section. The species was first described in 1978.

Growth and morphology

A. elegans has been cultivated on both Czapek yeast extract agar (CYA) plates and Malt Extract Agar Oxoid® (MEAOX) plates. The growth morphology of the colonies can be seen in the pictures below.

References 

elegans
Fungi described in 1887